E2-E4, released in 1984, is a solo recording by German musician and Ash Ra Tempel founder Manuel Göttsching. The album consists of one minimalistic, hour-long electronic track that Göttsching recorded in one take using a sequencer, with improvised keyboards, metallic percussion, and guitar playing.

The album is named after the most popular opening chess move 1. e2-e4 (which is expressed in long algebraic notation). A noteworthy pun on E2-E4 exists—when expressed in standard scientific pitch notation, the harmonic range of a guitar's strings extends from E2 (82.407 Hz) to E4 (329.63 Hz).

Influence
Pitchfork and The Guardian named the album one of the best of the 1980s for its important role in the development of house and techno music of the late 1980s and early 1990s. Though inspired in part by New York's Latin club rhythms in addition to minimalists like Steve Reich, Göttsching was surprised when he learned that people danced to the track.

The song became a hit at New York's Paradise Garage dance club. Sueño Latino sampled E2-E4 on its 1989 song "Sueño Latino." The album also would be an early influence on ambient techno works by Carl Craig, the Black Dog, and The Orb. In 1994, Craig released a remix named "Remake" under his alias of Paperclip People. Basic Channel released a "Basic Reshape" remix of "Remake", which would be included on their compilation album BCD under the name of "e2e4 Basic Reshape."

Track sections
Original vinyl presses of the album gave the following titles and approximate times on the cover. Original presses (and various reissues) sectioned the album into two halves, giving Side 1 and 2 durations of 31:38 and 23:00 respectively. Later digital editions simply have one track with a 58:39 running time.

Personnel
 Manuel Göttsching - ARP Odyssey, ARP Sequencer, AKG BX-5, Dynacord DRS-78, Dynacord TAM-19, EKO Computerhythm, EMS Synthi A, Farfisa Syntorchestra, Korg Polysix, Moog Minimoog, Pearl Syncussion, Publison DHM-89B2 and Sequential Circuits Prophet-10.

References 

1984 albums
Chess in music